The Daily Record is a seven-day morning daily newspaper of the USA Today Network located in Parsippany-Troy Hills, New Jersey.

The Daily Record serves the greater Morris County area of northern New Jersey, Essex County and the south-western suburbs of New York City. It is owned by Gannett, who purchased it from the Goodson Newspaper Group in 1998. Goodson had owned the paper since 1987.

See also
 List of newspapers in New Jersey

References

External links
 

Gannett publications
Morris County, New Jersey
Newspapers published in New Jersey
Newspapers established in 1900